Mauro Brandoni (born December 19, 1984 in Buenos Aires, Argentina) is an Argentine former professional footballer who played as a defender.

External links
 
 

1984 births
Living people
Argentine footballers
Footballers from Buenos Aires
Association football defenders
Provincial Osorno footballers
Argentine expatriate footballers
Argentine expatriate sportspeople in Chile
Expatriate footballers in Chile
Argentine expatriate sportspeople in Ecuador
Expatriate footballers in Ecuador